Bonisile John Kani (born 30 August 1943) is a South African actor, author, director and playwright. He is known for portraying T'Chaka in the Marvel Cinematic Universe films Captain America: Civil War (2016) and Black Panther (2018), Rafiki in the 2019 remake of The Lion King and Colonel Ulenga in the Netflix film Murder Mystery (2019).

Early and personal life
Kani was born on 30 August 1943 in New Brighton, Port Elizabeth In the Eastern Cape province. In 1975, after appearing in Athol Fugard's anti-apartheid play Sizwe Banzi Is Dead, which he also co-wrote, in the United States, Kani returned to South Africa. There, he received a phone call saying that his father wanted to see him. On his way there, he was surrounded by police who beat him and left him for dead. His left eye was lost as a result of the incident and he now wears a prosthesis which is technically a glass eye.

His son Atandwa is also an actor, who made his debut on U.S. television on the CW series Life Is Wild, and played a younger version of Kani's character T'Chaka in Black Panther.

Career
Kani joined The Serpent Players (a group of actors whose first performance was in the former snake pit of the zoo, hence the name) in Port Elizabeth in 1965 and helped to create many plays that went unpublished but were performed to a resounding reception.

These were followed by the more famous Sizwe Banzi is Dead and The Island, co-written with Athol Fugard and Winston Ntshona, in the early 1970s. Kani also received an Olivier Award nomination for his role in My Children! My Africa!

Kani's work has been widely performed around the world, including New York, where he and Winston Ntshona won a Tony Award in 1975 for Sizwe Banzi Is Dead (which ran for 159 performances) and The Island.' These two plays were presented in repertory at the Edison Theatre for a total of 52 performances.

In 1987 Kani played Othello in a performance of William Shakespeare's play of the same name in South Africa, which was still under apartheid. "At least I'll be able to kiss Desdemona without leaving a smudge," he said then.

Nothing but the Truth (2002) was his debut as sole playwright and was first performed in the Market Theatre in Johannesburg. This play takes place in post-apartheid South Africa and does not concern the conflicts between whites and blacks, but the rift between blacks who stayed in South Africa to fight apartheid, and those who left only to return when the hated regime folded. It won the 2003 Fleur du Cap Awards for the best actor and best new South African play. In the same year, he was also awarded a special Obie Award for his extraordinary contribution to theatre in the United States.

Kani is executive trustee of the John Kani Theatre Foundation, founder and director of the John Kani Theatre Laboratory and chairman of the National Arts Council of SA. He starred as T'Chaka in the Marvel Studios blockbusters Captain America: Civil War (2016) and Black Panther (2018). The fact that Kani was a Xhosa native speaker led Chadwick Boseman, who played his onscreen son T'Challa, to make that Wakanda's language, and to learn whole scenes in Xhosa, although he had never studied the language before.

In 2019, Kani appeared in the Netflix film Murder Mystery where he played Colonel Ulenga. He then voiced Rafiki in The Lion King (the live action remake of the Disney animated film).

Kani's play, Kunene and the King, a co-production for the Royal Shakespeare Company and Fugard Theatre, played in the Swan Theatre in Stratford-upon-Avon in 2019 before transferring back to Cape Town. He starred alongside fellow South African Antony Sher.

Other recognition and awards
On 20 February 2010, Kani received a SAFTA Life Time award. He has also received the Avanti Hall of Fame Award from the South African film, television, and advertising industries, an M-Net Plum award and a Clio award in New York. Other awards include the Hiroshima Peace Culture Foundation Award for the year 2000 and the Olive Schreiner Prize for 2005. He was voted 51st in the Top 100 Great South Africans in 2004.

In 2006, he was awarded an honorary doctorate by the University of Cape Town. Nelson Mandela Metropolitan University appointed him an honorary Doctor of Philosophy in 2013.

In 2016 Kani received the national honour of the Order of Ikhamanga in Silver, for his "Excellent contributions to theatre and, through this, the struggle for a non-racial, non-sexist and democratic South Africa".

The main theatre of the Market Theatre complex in Newtown, Johannesburg, has been renamed The John Kani Theatre in his honour.

In 2020 he was awarded an honorary doctorate by the University of the Witwatersrand Recently, in 2021, John Kani has been conferred the Da Vinci Laureate by The Da Vinci Institute.

Plays
 Sizwe Banzi is Dead (1972) (co-authored with Athol Fugard and Winston Ntshona)
 The Island (1973) (co-authored with Athol Fugard and Winston Ntshona)
 Statements After an Arrest Under the Immorality Act (co-authored with Athol Fugard and Winston Ntshona)
 My Children My Africa! (actor)
 Nothing But the Truth (2002) (sole playwright)
 The Tempest (2008) (actor in the role of Caliban, at the Baxter Theatre, Cape Town; Courtyard Theatre, Stratford-upon-Avon; and tour of Richmond, Leeds, Bath, Nottingham, Sheffield)
 Missing (2014) (actor and sole playwright)
 Kunene and the King (2019) (actor and playwright)

Film and television

Drama
 Nothing But the Truth (2002)

References

External links
 
 Bonisile John Kani at SA History Online
 

1943 births
Living people
20th-century South African male actors
21st-century South African male actors
People from New Brighton, Eastern Cape
Recipients of the Order of Ikhamanga
South African dramatists and playwrights
South African male film actors
South African male television actors
South African male voice actors
Tony Award winners
Xhosa people